Otto Kröber (22 May 1882 in Hamburg – 5 January 1969) was a German entomologist specialising in Diptera. He worked mainly on Tabanidae, Omphralidae, Therevidae and Conopidae.

Kröber was a professor in the Zoological Museum in Hamburg (now Zoologisches Institut und Zoologisches Museum, Universitat von Hamburg, Hamburg, Germany).

Works

Selected

Therevidae.Genera.Ins. (1913).

Collections

National Museum of Natural History via J. M. Aldrich Washington; Muséum national d'histoire naturelle via J. Surcouf and Staatliches Museum für Tierkunde Dresden

References

German entomologists
Dipterists
1882 births
1969 deaths
20th-century German zoologists
Academic staff of the University of Hamburg